Cava de' Tirreni (Cilentan: A Càva) is a city and comune in the region of Campania, Italy, in the province of Salerno,  northwest of the town of Salerno. It lies in a richly cultivated valley surrounded by wooded hills, and is a popular tourist resort. The abbey of La Trinità della Cava is located there.

Geography

Overview 
The inhabited area is 198 m above sea level, in a valley situated between two mountain groups: the Lattari Mountains (which separate Cava from the Amalfi Coast) to the west and the Picentini Mountains to the east. Many of Cava's citizens reside in the hills surrounding the town.

Cava is bordered to the north by Nocera Superiore, Roccapiemonte and Mercato San Severino; to the east by Baronissi, Pellezzano and Salerno; to the south by Vietri sul Mare and Maiori; and to the west by Tramonti. The town is a link between the geographical area of Agro Nocerino Sarnese (flat, with an agricultural and industrial economy) and the Sorrento Peninsula (mountainous, with an economy based on tourism).

Frazioni 
The  of Cava are: Alessia, Annunziata, Arcara, Casaburi-Rotolo, Castagneto, Corpo di Cava, Croce, Dupino, Marini, Passiano, Pregiato, San Cesareo, San Pietro, Sant'Anna, Sant'Arcangelo, San Martino, Santa Lucia, Santa Maria del Rovo, Santi Quaranta.

History 
The church and the greater part of the abbey buildings were entirely modernized in 1796. The old Gothic cloisters are preserved. The church contains a fine organ and several ancient sarcophagi. The archives, now national property, include fine incunabula, documents and manuscripts of great value (including the Codex Legum Longobardorum of 1004 and the La Cava Bible).

Main sights 

Abbey of La Trinità della Cava, founded in 1011. Features include the ambon with mosaics (12th century), the grotto of St. Alferius, the Romanesque cloister (13th century) and the large library, housing more than 50,000 volumes.
Cathedral (Duomo), begun in 1517 and opened in 1571.
Sanctuary of St. Francis and St. Anthony, an early 16th-century structure restored after the 1980 earthquake had damaged it. The façade is in tuff and travertine, with three large arches, the central one surmounted by a balcony. The main portal has a series of friezes sculpted in 1528 by local masters and containing scenes from the Gospels. The belltower, with three orders, was finished in 1584. The interior is on the Latin Cross plan, with some 16th-century frescoes by Belisario Corenzio in the sacristy.

Personalities 
Lucia Apicella (Mamma Lucia, philanthropist)
Ferrante I d'Aragona (Ferdinand I of Naples, King of Naples from 1458 to 1494)
Mario Avagliano (historian and journalist)
Tommaso Avagliano (writer and publisher)
Ferdinando Baldi (film director, film producer and screenwriter)
Alfonso Balzico (sculptor and painter)
Pope Boniface IX
Alda Borelli, actress in theatre and silent films
Donato Antonio Cafaro (16th century engineer)
Donato Antonio Cafaro (17th century royal engineer, probably descended from the previous)
Giambattista Castaldo (16th century soldier)
Giuliana De Sio (actress)
Teresa De Sio (singer)
Giovanni Vincenzo Della Monica (16th century engineer; collaborated with Giovan Battista Cavagna)
Raffaele Della Monica (cartoonist)
Antonietta Di Martino (high jumper, Italian indoor/outdoor champion)
Antonio Fiorentino della Cava (architect, designer of the cloisters of Santa Caterina a Formiello)
Giulio Genoino (Catholic priest; originator, with Masaniello, of the Neapolitan Revolt of 1647)
Costantino Grimaldi (philosopher, jurist, politician and noted anticurialist)
Simonetta Lamberti (10-year-old victim of a Camorra killing)
Sabato Martelli Castaldi (General of the Italian Air Force, partisan and martyr killed in the slaughter of the Fosse Ardeatine massacre on 24 March 1944; posthumous Gold Medal of Military Valor)
Attilio Mellone (member of the Franciscan order and man of letters)
Eduardo Migliaccio (actor and comedian)
Gino Palumbo (journalist)
Giampaolo Parisi (football player)
Andrea Rispoli (football player)
Fausto Salsano (football manager)
Raffaele Schiavi (football player)
Stefano Sorrentino (football player)
Federico Pisapia, Marco Senatore, Vincenzo Schiavo, Giuseppe Schiavo (First FLAGS artists in Cirque du Soliel 2011)

Twin towns – sister cities
Cava de' Tirreni is twinned with:
 Gorzów Wielkopolski, Poland
 Kaunas, Lithuania
 Pittsfield, USA
 Schwerte, Germany
 Nesvizh, Belarus
 Tbilisi, Georgia

See also 
 Roman Catholic Diocese of Cava
 La Trinità della Cava

References

External links 

Tuttosucava.it – All about Cava (click on union flag to see English translation)
Local Tourist Office of Cava de' Tirreni (English version)
CampaniaMeteo: weather report and forecast 
Archidiocese of Amalfi-Cava de' Tirreni 
Photos of Cava de' Tirreni 

 
Cities and towns in Campania